Francis Godolphin (died 1652), of Treveneage in Cornwall, was an English Member of Parliament. The son of Sir William Godolphin of Treveneage, he represented St Ives in the Parliament of 1628–9 and again in the Long Parliament. Unlike his relatives in the senior branch of the Godolphin family, he supported the Parliamentary cause on the outbreak of the Civil War, and continued to sit through most of the 1640s; however, there is no record of his having taken any part in proceedings after Pride's Purge. (He should not be confused with his namesake and cousin once removed, Francis Godolphin of Godolphin, who was also a member of the Long Parliament but was ejected as a Royalist in 1644.)

Godolphin married Ann Carew in 1616, and they had three children:
 Francis Godolphin of Crowan
 Catherine Godolphin, who married John St Aubyn of Clowance
 Loveday Godolphin
He died in 1652, and was buried on 4 February 1652 at Crowan.

References
D Brunton & D H Pennington, Members of the Long Parliament (London: George Allen & Unwin, 1954)
 Burke's Extinct Peerage (London: Henry Colburn & Richard Bentley, 1831) 
Cobbett's Parliamentary history of England, from the Norman Conquest in 1066 to the year 1803 (London: Thomas Hansard, 1808) 
 Vivian's Visitations of Cornwall (Exeter: William Pollard & Co, 1887) 
 

1652 deaths
Year of birth missing
Members of the pre-1707 English Parliament for constituencies in Cornwall
English MPs 1628–1629
English MPs 1640–1648
Francis